Eric Carlberg (born 28 August 1974) is a Swedish professional golfer.

Carlberg won the Ramlösa Open on the Challenge Tour in 1994 as an amateur. He played on the Challenge Tour 1995–2002. He missed his European Tour card by one shot at the Challenge Tour Grand Final in 1999 and failed again at the qualifying school, but made an immediate impact by leading from start to finish to win the Challenge de España, the opening event of the 2000 Challenge Tour season.

Carlberg played 14 events on the European Tour where his best performance was a tie for fourth at the 1999 Moroccan Open.

Professional wins (4)

Challenge Tour wins (2)

Nordic Golf League wins (2)

Team appearances
Amateur
Eisenhower Trophy (representing Sweden): 1994

References

External links

Swedish male golfers
European Tour golfers
Sportspeople from Stockholm County
People from Köping
People from Lidingö Municipality
1974 births
Living people
21st-century Swedish people